The gunungan ("mountain"), also known as kayon or kayonan (from kayu, "wood" or "tree") in Bali, is a figure in the Indonesian theatrical performance of wayang e.g. wayang kulit, wayang klitik, wayang golek, and wayang beber.

Gunungan is a conical or triangular structure (tapered peak) inspired by the shape of a mountain (volcano).

In wayang, gunungan are special figures in the form of pictures of mountains and its contents. Gunungan has many functions in wayang performances, therefore, there are many different depictions.

In the standard function, as the opening and closing of a performance stage, two things are depicted on two different sides. On one side, at the bottom is a picture of a gate guarded by two Rakshasa holding swords and shields. It symbolizes the palace gate, and when played the gunungan is used as a palace.  At the top of the mountain is the tree of life (kalpataru) which is entangled by a dragon. On the tree branch depicted several forest animals, such as tigers, bulls, monkeys, and birds. The picture as a whole depicts the situation in the wilderness. This side symbolizes the state of the world and its contents. On the other side, a blazing fire is depicted. It symbolizes chaos and hell.

Before the puppet is played, the gunungan is stuck in the middle of the screen, leaning slightly to the right which means that the wayang play has not yet started, like a world that has not yet been told. After playing, Gunungan is removed, lined up on the right.

Gunungan is used as a sign of changing plays/story stages. For that the mountains are plugged in the middle leaning to the left. In addition, gunungan is also used to symbolize fire or wind. In this case the side of the mountain is reversed, on the other hand there is only red-red paint, and this color symbolizes fire.

Gunungan can act as land, forest, roads and others by following the dialogue of the dhalang. After the play is finished, Gunungan is plugged again in the center of the screen, symbolizing that the story is finished.

Gunungan there are two kinds, namely Gunungan Gapuran and Gunungan Blumbangan.  Gunungan Blumbangan was composed by Sunan Kalijaga in the era of the Demak Kingdom. Then during the Kartasura era, it was composed again with the Gunungan Gapuran. Gunungan in puppet terms is called Kayon. Kayon comes from the word Kayun. Gunungan contains high philosophical teachings, namely the teachings of wisdom. All of this implies that the play in the wayang contains lessons of high value. This means that wayang performances also contain wayang performances that also contain high philosophical teachings.

Outside Indonesia

Malaysia
In Kelantan, Peninsular Malaysia, a similar figure is set up in the local iteration of the performance known as the pohon beringin ("banyan"). The beringin is often displayed in the beginning and the end of the performance symbolizing "a world loaded with lives...in the water, on the land and in the air".

Gallery

See also

 Wayang
 Javanese culture
 Theatre of Indonesia
 Culture of Indonesia

References

Main sources

 
 
 

Shadows
Wayang
Arts in Malaysia
Arts in Indonesia
Precursors of film
Theatrical genres